Events from the year 1938 in Italy.

Incumbents 

 King: Victor Emmanuel III
 Prime Minister: Benito Mussolini

Events 
19 June – Italy wins the FIFA World Cup by defeating Hungary, 4–2, in the final game at the Stade Olympique de Colombes in Paris, France.

Births
 8 March – Bruno Pizzul, sports journalist 
 21 March – Luigi Tenco, singer-songwriter (died 1967)
 21 June – Mario Minieri, road bicycle racer
 19 July – Sergio Martino, film director and producer
 16 August – Cosimo Nocera, footballer (died 2012)
 28 August – Maurizio Costanzo, television news reporter

Deaths
 January 4 – Paola Drigo, novelist (born 1876)
 February 9 – Arturo Caprotti, engineer and architect (born 1881)

References 

 
1930s in Italy
Years of the 20th century in Italy